Żak (pronounced like French Jacques) is a Polish family name.

 Zygmunt Solorz-Żak (born 1956) Polish businessman
 Szymon Żak (1507–1591) Polish Calvinist pastor

In the Polish wikipedia
 :pl:Maciej Żak (1962) Polish film director
 :pl:Cezary Żak (1961) Polish actor
 :pl:Stanisław Żak (1932) Polski literature scholar
 :pl:Piotr Żak (1957) Polish politician and bridge player
 :pl:Adam Żak (1950) Polski Jezuit philosopher
 :pl:Czesław Żak (1895–1959) Polish composer

Polish-language surnames